Little Women: Atlanta is an American reality television series that debuted on January 27, 2016, on Lifetime. It is the third spin-off series to Little Women: LA. The series chronicles the lives of a group of little women living in Atlanta, Georgia. For the third season, Briana Barlup & Emily Fernandez moved to the show Little Women: Dallas concurrent with their move to Texas.

Cast

Overview

Season 1-3
The first season follows the lives of Ashley "Minnie" Ross (also called "Mama Bear"), Tiffany "Monie" Cashette, Briana Barlup (Bri) & Emily Fernandez, also known as "the Cheeks", and Amanda & Andrea Salinas, also called "Tiny Twinz" as the main cast, with Shirlene "Ms. Juicy" Pearson in a recurring capacity.

The second season premiered on July 13, 2016, with the same cast, with Shirlene Pearson promoted to a main cast member while Samantha Ortiz and Tanya Scott make guest appearances, and with Melissa Hancock and the Drummond twins in the recurring guest capacity. Briana Barlup and Emily Fernandez announced at the reunion that they would no longer be part of the show and were moving to Little Women: Dallas.

The third season premiered on January 4, 2017, with Tanya Scott promoted to a main cast member, Samantha Ortiz in a recurring capacity and Abira Greene appeared in a guest recurring capacity.

Season 4-6
The fourth season premiered on December 14, 2017, with the same cast, with Samantha Ortiz promoted to a main cast member. However, after season four ended, Samantha and Tanya announced that they would no longer be a part of the show. According to Tanya, she felt as if the show did not bring positive energy into her life. She felt as if two seasons were enough. It is unclear whether Samantha had been asked to return to the show despite rumors hinting of the failed retention as her termination.

The fifth season premiered on March 28, 2019, and featured a revamp, furthering the careers and passions of the ladies.  The fifth season saw the departure of both Scott and Ortiz, and the return of Barlup and Fernandez after departing the series after the second season. Tiffany "Monie" Cashette returned as a recurring member for the fifth season, citing a move to Houston as the reason for her departure. Both Barlup and Fernandez departed the series a second time at the end of the fifth season.

The sixth season premiered on January 22, 2021, with Cashette returning to the series as a main cast member, as well as Abira Greene, who had been featured for the past three seasons, promoted to a main cast member. This season also features the death of original cast member, Ashley "Minnie" Ross, who died on April 27, 2020 after sustaining injuries in a head-on-collision. Barlup and Scott return in recurring roles, and Tamera MacLaughlin joins the cast in a recurring capacity.

Episodes

Series overview

Season 1 (2016)

Season 2 (2016)

Season 3 (2017)

Season 4 (2017–18)

Season 5 (2019)

Season 6 (2021)

References

External links
 
 
 

2010s American reality television series
2016 American television series debuts
English-language television shows
Lifetime (TV network) original programming
Little Women: LA
Television shows set in Atlanta
American television spin-offs
Reality television spin-offs
Television shows about dwarfism
Women in Atlanta